Mārtiņš Cipulis (born November 29, 1980) is a Latvian ice hockey left winger currently playing for Dinamo Riga, in the Kontinental Hockey League.

Awards
 2003–04  LHL Best Forward
 LHL  -HK Riga 2000 Champions 2003–04, 2004–05  and 2005–06

Career statistics

Regular season and playoffs

LAT totals do not include numbers from the 2005–06	season.

International

References

External links
 

1980 births
Living people
Dinamo Riga players
HK Liepājas Metalurgs players
Ice hockey players at the 2006 Winter Olympics
Ice hockey players at the 2010 Winter Olympics
Ice hockey players at the 2014 Winter Olympics
Latvian ice hockey left wingers
Olympic ice hockey players of Latvia
People from Cēsis
HC Lev Praha players
Amur Khabarovsk players
Metallurg Zhlobin players
HK Poprad players
HK Riga 2000 players
Expatriate ice hockey players in Russia
Latvian expatriate sportspeople in Russia
Latvian expatriate sportspeople in Slovakia
Latvian expatriate sportspeople in Belarus
Latvian expatriate sportspeople in the Czech Republic
Latvian expatriate sportspeople in Austria
Expatriate ice hockey players in Slovakia
Expatriate ice hockey players in Belarus
Expatriate ice hockey players in the Czech Republic
Expatriate ice hockey players in Austria